Scandriglia is a  (municipality) in the Province of Rieti in the Italian region of Latium, located about  northeast of Rome and about  south of Rieti.

In the frazione of Ponticelli Sabino, is located the Franciscan convent and sanctuary of Santa Maria delle Grazie, built originally in the 15th century. On a mountainside overlooking the town is the former convent and church of the Capuchin order, San Nicola.

References

External links
Official website

Cities and towns in Lazio